In mathematics, Fubini's theorem on differentiation, named after Guido Fubini, is a result in real analysis concerning the differentiation of series of monotonic functions. It can be proven by using Fatou's lemma and the properties of null sets.

Statement 
Assume  is an interval and that for every natural number k,  is an increasing function. If, 

exists for all  then for almost any  the derivatives exist and are related as: 

References 

Theorems in real analysis
Theorems in measure theory